The 2017 Oregon wildfires were a series of wildfires that burned over the course of 2017.

The 2017 fire season in the state of Oregon was a particularly notable one. There has been a trend for the last three decades that shows an increase in the overall number of wildfires as well as the fire season length in the state of Oregon. In 2017 Oregon experienced a total of 1,069 reported wildfires: with 779 human ignited and 290 ignited by lightning strikes.  These fires burned a total area of 451,863 acres. The catalyst for these fires was the abnormal weather patterns that persisted throughout 2017.

Fire season typically begins in Oregon in May. Fires burning through September 2017 led to the month being dubbed "Smoketember" in Oregon, with air quality in western Oregon listed  from "Unhealthy" to "Hazardous" in early weeks. NASA published images of the Oregon, shown the typically green state to be highly obscured by smoke, as seen from space. 2017 was unusual for the large number of fires occurring west of the Cascade Range in dense Douglas-fir forest in contrast to the frequent-fire pine ecosystems to the east.

Large fires include the Chetco Bar Fire in Curry County, Oregon, and the Eagle Creek Fire in the Columbia River Gorge National Scenic Area, which was started by illegal fireworks use. Fires in the Columbia River Gorge shut down Interstate 84, the state's major east–west freeway, for several days in early September.

2017 climate in Oregon 
The 2016/2017 winter in Oregon was the second wettest winter in the past 75 years. Between the dates of October 1, 2016, and April 26, 2017, Portland International Airport received 45.5 inches (116 centimeters) of rain. The month of February 2017 was the wettest February on record in Oregon with 10.36 inches (26 centimeters) of rain. During the month of August, the weather station at Portland International Airport recorded a monthly average temperature of 73.6 degrees Fahrenheit (23.1 C) with the daily average temperature hitting 87 degrees Fahrenheit (30.5 C). The average temperature during the month of August 2017 was five degrees higher than the average August temperature recorded since 1941. It stands to be the second hottest August on record.

The extreme winter and summer weather that occurred in 2017 was met by some dangerous weather patterns in the late summer months. Early August through September in Southern Oregon saw several waves of thunderstorms. These storm systems brought rainfall which helped slow the growth of existing wildfires. However, the storms also brought lighting which resulted in the ignition of new fires. These storms travel on fast moving paths. After one these storms moves over an area, it quickly returns to a hot dry state. This allows for the newly ignited fires to spread quickly and develop into full wildfires.

Significance of the 2017 fire season
The future climate in the Pacific Northwest is expected to be significantly different.  Projections show that annual temperatures will rise faster than the global norm.  Although temperatures will be higher, winters are expected to experience more rainfall. These seasonal extremes are exactly the type of trends that were experienced in 2017. Climatic patterns such as these provide ample rainfall throughout the spring which allows for high rates of plant growth. The high temperatures in the summer then quickly dries up the new growth.  This leads to large spread availability of dry grasses and small diameter fuels. The combination of these climate driven phenomenon are what led to the extreme fire season in Oregon in 2017.

Cheatgrass
Another problem plaguing Oregon in 2017 was invasive cheatgrass. This grass has its origins in Eurasia and has become a huge problem in Oregon. In burned areas this grass quickly replaces native vegetation such as sagebrush. Cheatgrass is especially dangerous in regards to wildfires because it is highly dependent on water and typically dries out a month before native Oregon grasses. The high rainfall in 2017 allowed cheatgrass to spread abundantly throughout eastern Oregon.  In areas that have cheatgrass, fire seasons have essentially been lengthened by a month due to the sooner availability of fuel.  Due to its ability to both cause fires and repopulate burned areas cheatgrass is in a positive feedback loop of continual dispersal.

Human-ignited fires
Oregon’s population has been in a steady state of growth for the last three decades. With higher populations comes higher risk of human ignited forest fires. 2017 saw the devastating effects of human influenced fires. The Eagle Creek Fire burned 48,831 acres of land. This fire was ignited by a smoke bomb carelessly thrown by a 15-year-old boy. Something as simple as the exhaust pipe of a car or a cigarette out of a car window can start a devastating fire.

Wildfires 
Table contains 2017 wildfires in Oregon that burned over 1,000 acres

Others fires include:  
 Ana Fire
 Blanket Creek Fire
 Indian Creek Fire
 Upper Mine Fire
 Horse Prairie Fire – Douglas County, Oregon
 Jade Creek Fire – Fremont–Winema National Forest
 Potato Hill Fire – Willamette National Forest
 Nash Fire – Willamette National Forest and Deschutes National Forest
 North Pelican Fire – Fremont-Winema National Forest

Fires on ODF land
The majority of the burned area within Oregon Department of Forestry (ODF) held land occurred within the SOA fire region which includes the districts: Southwest, Coos, Douglas, South Cascade, and Western Lane. The SOA fire region experienced 38,384.33 acres of burned land. The EOA fire region had the second highest amount of burned area and includes the fire districts of: Central Oregon, Northeast Oregon, Klamath- Lake, and Walker Range. This fire region experienced a total of 4,992.6 acres of burned land. The NOA saw the least amount of area burned but still had 151 individual fires ignited within the region. The NOA fire region includes the fire districts of: Tillamook, Astoria, Forest Grove, West Oregon, and North Cascade. The fires in this region accounted for a total of 2168.88 acres of burned land. In 2017 the Oregon Department of Forestry had 45,681.5 acres of land burned in their forests.

References

External links

 Wildfire tracker from The Oregonian